Ballard High School is a high school in the eastern suburbs of Louisville, Kentucky, and is a part of the Jefferson County Public Schools (JCPS) school district. The school opened in the fall of 1968. The first students were in grades 7-9, and a grade was added each year as the building was expanded. This kept the school system from having to transfer upper class students from other high schools. The first class (consisting of the original freshmen) graduated in 1972. From its founding until the mid-1980s the principal was Patrick Crawford. Sandy Allen served from the mid-1980s to the 2003–2004 school year. The principal from 2004 through 2013 was Jim Jury. Staci Edelman was the 4th and shortest standing principal, from 2015-2017, with a term marked by racial tension and controversy. The current principal is Jason Neuss. The school offers grades 9-12.

Ballard participates in the Jefferson County Public Schools Advanced Program, a program designed to provide accelerated instruction for academically gifted and talented students. The school also offers over 20 Advanced Placement) courses.

Campus
The campus at Ballard High School consists of the main school building as well as the fine arts building. The main building is referred to by students and faculty as four separate buildings (North, South, East, and West), although all four sections are connected to each other by overhead walkways. The South and North buildings house the majority of the classrooms at Ballard High School as well as the North and South offices. The West building's first floor is the home of Ballard's famed art department and the 2nd floor houses the Library. The East building's 1st floor contains the three cafeterias, the Ballard Bank, and the Ballard Student Guidance Center (College Counselor.) The East building second floor is the home of Ballard's award-winning Music department as well as both the large and small gymnasiums.

The Sandy Allen Fine Arts Center is a performing arts facility on the Ballard High School campus. The . facility, which opened in 1998, seats 900. The fine arts center is used for musical and theatrical productions put on by the school's fine arts department. In 1999, it was awarded the AIA KY Merit Award of Excellence for its design. 

In Kentucky, care must be taken not to confuse this school with Ballard Memorial High School, the public high school that serves Ballard County in the far-western Jackson Purchase.

Demographics 
The following table represents the breakdown of students by race/ethnicity from the 2013-14 and 2022-21 school years.

Choir, band, orchestra and speech 
The Ballard choral program is one of the largest in the state of Kentucky and is the only fully graded-sequential program in Jefferson County. Each year a large number of students are accepted into the KMEA All-State Choirs and many go on to participate in university choral programs. The choir has received distinguished ratings at the regional KMEA Assessment every year since 1995 and has received national and international awards in the past. The choral program also has a strong club aspect with the school's Madrigal Singers, made up of choral students, being known for putting on a Madrigal Feaste each year for the community.  The current choir director is Noel Weaver.

Notable alumni

 Jo Adell, first round pick in 2017 MLB Draft by Los Angeles Angels
 Ronnie Baker, third-fastest man in history for the 60 Meter Dash
 Dotsie Bausch, track cyclist and member of 2012 U.S. Olympic team
Dontez Byrd, NFL football player
 Jerry Eaves, NBA basketball player for Utah Jazz
 Craig Greenberg (born 1973), businessman, lawyer, and politician; Mayor-elect of Louisville
 Sid Griffin, musician and co-founder of The Long Ryders
 Earl Heyman, member of NFL Super Bowl champion New Orleans Saints, also CFL defensive lineman for Edmonton Eskimos
 Allan Houston, Kentucky Mr. Basketball (1989), All-SEC, All-American, and all-time leading scorer at University of Tennessee, NBA guard for Detroit Pistons and New York Knicks
 Jeremi Johnson, fullback for Cincinnati Bengals
 Shawn Kelley, Major League Baseball player for Washington Nationals, New York Yankees
 James Kim, 1989, CNET editor and victim of hypothermia
 Jeff Lamp, basketball player
 Kelan Martin, NBA basketball player for the Indiana Pacers
 DeVante Parker, first round pick in 2015 NFL Draft, wide receiver for Miami Dolphins
 Bill Plaschke, sports columnist for Los Angeles Times and panelist on ESPN's Around the Horn
 Michael Saag, 1973, physician, infectious disease expert
 Jeremy Sowers, baseball player for Cleveland Indians and Manager of Major League Operations for the Tampa Bay Rays
 Wayne Kent Taylor, founder and former CEO of casual-dining chain Texas Roadhouse
 DeJuan Wheat, NBA basketball player

See also
 Public schools in Louisville, Kentucky

References

External links
 

Jefferson County Public Schools (Kentucky)
Public high schools in Kentucky
Educational institutions established in 1968
1968 establishments in Kentucky
High schools in Louisville, Kentucky